Carolyn L. Cannon-Alfred (born August 16, 1934August 29, 1987) was an American pharmacologist who established a medical clinic in South-central Los Angeles. She was an assistant professor of pharmacology at the Keck School of Medicine of USC and a senior pharmacologist at Riker Laboratories. Cannon-Alfred co-authored the Medical Handbook for the Layman in 1971.

Early life and education 
Cannon-Alfred was born on August 16, 1934 in Tyler, Texas. She graduated from Emmett J. Scott High School in 1950. Cannon-Alfred was a member of the St. James Colored Methodist Episcopal Church. She completed a bachelor's from the University of Toledo in 1954. Cannon-Alfred earned a M.S. from Howard University in 1957. Her thesis was titled Studies on the acute effects of cortisone, with special reference to the heart: influence of potassium, digitalis and N-Allyl-Nor-Morphine (Nalline).

Cannon-Alfred served as an assistant pharmacologist and instructor of pharmacology at Howard University between 1957 and 1959. She earned a Ph.D. in pharmacology from Georgetown University in 1961. Her dissertation was titled The nature of Cocaine desensitization of Ephedrine Pressor responses.

Career 
Cannon-Alfred was hired as a Senior Pharmacologist at Riker Laboratories, and in 1962 she took a research associate position at California Riverside Hospital. She received a two-year research grant from the National Heart Institute in 1964, and she moved to the Keck School of Medicine of USC as an assistant professor of pharmacology. Cannon-Alfred researched cardiac and autonomic pharmacology. 

Cannon-Alfred and her husband, J. Tyrone Alfred, wrote Medical Handbook for the Layman. The city council of Los Angeles honored Cannon-Alfred and her husband for the book and presented them with a council resolution in a 1971 ceremony held at city hall. She and her husband established a medical clinic in south-central Los Angeles, and Cannon-Alfred's wish was to buy an apartment complex in the area that could serve as living arrangements for senior citizens.

Personal life 
Cannon-Alfred was married to J. Tyrone Alfred. They had three daughters. Cannon-Alfred died on August 29, 1987 in a Los Angeles hospital after a sudden illness.

Selected publications

References 

People from Tyler, Texas
University of Toledo alumni
Howard University alumni
Georgetown University School of Medicine alumni
American pharmacologists
Women pharmacologists
1934 births
Academics from Texas
20th-century African-American scientists
1989 deaths
African-American women scientists
20th-century American women scientists
20th-century African-American women
Keck School of Medicine of USC faculty
3M people